Balduin Hoyoul (1547-8 – 26 November 1594) was a Renaissance composer of the Franco-Flemish school.

Hoyoul was born in Liège.  From the age of 13 he was a discant singer at the Court in Stuttgart under Ludwig Daser. Between 1563 and 1564 he was a pupil of Lassus in Munich. In 1589 Hoyoul took over from his father-in-law as Hofkapellmeister in Stuttgart. In 1593 he applied, unsuccessfully, for the more prestigious court post at Dresden. He died of the plague in Stuttgart in 1594, and was succeeded in Stuttgart by another pupil of Lassus, Leonhard Lechner.

Works
 Sacrae cantiones, 5-10 voices. Nuremberg, 1587
 Geistliche Lieder und Psalmen. Nuremberg, 1589
 Missa "Anchor che col partire"
 Missa super "Rossignoles qui chantes au vert"
 8 Magnificats
 19 German Hymns
 Latin Motets

Recordings
 Hoyoul: Sacræ Cantiones: Hofkapelle, dir. Michael Procter. Christophorus.

References

1547 births
1594 deaths
Belgian composers
Male composers
Belgian male musicians
Prince-Bishopric of Liège musicians
16th-century deaths from plague (disease)
16th-century composers